The River Flows Eastwards is a 2005 Chinese television series starring Hu Jun, Anita Yuen, Carina Lau and Chen Daoming, adapted from the classic Chinese film The Spring River Flows East.

2005 Chinese television series debuts
Chinese period television series
Live action television shows based on films
Mandarin-language television shows